César Amaya (born 12 October 1990) is a Colombian professional footballer who plays as forward for Cortuluá.

Honours 
Atlético Bucaramanga
 Categoría Primera B (1): 2015

Deportes Tolima
 Copa Colombia (1): 2014

Deportivo Cali
 Copa Colombia (1): 2010

External links 
 

1990 births
Living people
Colombian footballers
Categoría Primera A players
Categoría Primera B players
Deportivo Cali footballers
Real Cartagena footballers
Atlético Bucaramanga footballers
Deportes Tolima footballers
Águilas Doradas Rionegro players
Once Caldas footballers
Deportivo Pasto footballers
Cortuluá footballers
Association football forwards
People from Valledupar